Kipngetich (also Kipng'etich) is a surname of Kenyan origin that stems from the surname Ngetich with the prefix Kip- (meaning "son of"). It may refer to:

Daniel Kipngetich Komen (born 1976), Kenyan long-distance track runner and former 5000 metres world champion
Franklin Kipngetich Bett (born 1953), Kenyan politician for the Orange Democratic Movement and Minister of Roads
Paul Kipngetich Tanui (born 1990), Kenyan long-distance runner and 2011 World Championships medallist
Robert Kipngetich (born 1982), Kenyan long-distance track runner
Silas Kipngetich Sang (born 1978), Kenyan half marathon runner

See also
Ngetich

Kalenjin names